Sarah Burgess may refer to:

Sarah Burgess (actress) (born 1970), British puppeteer, actress and vocal artist
Sarah Burgess (playwright), American playwright and screenwriter
Sarah Burgess (racing driver) (born 1980), Australian racing driver
Sarah Burgess (singer) (born 1987), American singer-songwriter

See also
Burgess (surname)